Blake Nolan Corum (born November 25, 2000) is an American football running back for the Michigan Wolverines. He won the Chicago Tribune Silver Football and was named a unanimous All-American in 2022 after rushing for over 1,400 yards with 18 touchdowns.

Early years and high school career
Corum was born on November 25, 2000, in Marshall, Virginia. He later attended Saint Frances Academy in Baltimore, Maryland. As a senior, he rushed for 1,438 yards and 22 touchdowns and led his team to a No. 4 national ranking. He was also selected as the Gatorade Player of the Year in Maryland during the 2019–20 academic year and as The Baltimore Sun'''s Offensive Player of the Year. He was rated as the No. 12 running back in the 2020 recruiting class.

College career
Corum enrolled at the University of Michigan in January 2020. In his first semester at Michigan, Corum drew praise for both running a 4.4 40-yard dash and earning a 4.0 grade point average. As a true freshman, Corum appeared in five games, rushing for 50 net yards and an average of 2.2 yards per carry.

Prior to the 2021 season, Sports Illustrated'' wrote that Corum was poised for a breakout year. Through the first two games of the 2021 season, Corum rushed for 282 yards on 35 carries. He averaged 141 rushing yards per game and also caught five passes for 33 yards. Against Washington, he tallied a career high 171 rushing yards and three touchdowns, including a 67-yard touchdown run. He also had 128 yards on kickoff returns and led the nation in all-purpose yards with an average of 221.5 yards per game.

On September 18, Corum recorded his third straight 100-yard rushing game, becoming the first Michigan player to accomplish this feat since Denard Robinson in 2011, and the first player to record 100-plus yards rushing in three consecutive games to start the season since Mike Hart in 2007.

2022 season
On September 17, 2022, Corum tied Michigan's modern-era record with five rushing touchdowns in a game against UConn. He became the first Michigan player to score four first-half touchdowns since Ed Shuttlesworth in 1972.

On September 24, Corum rushed for a career-high 243 yards and two touchdowns on 30 carries in a 34–27 win over Maryland. His 243 rushing yards was the most for a Michigan player since Denard Robinson rushed for 258 yards in 2010. He continued with 133 yards against Iowa on October 1, 124 yards against Indiana on October 8, 166 yards against Penn State on October 15, and 177 yards against Michigan State on October 29. Corum was named Big Ten Offensive Player of the Week for his performances against Maryland and Michigan State.

Corum suffered a knee injury in the first half of Michigan's 11th game against Illinois and played sparingly the rest of that game and the following week against Ohio State. On December 1, 2022, it was announced that Corum would undergo knee surgery, ending his season before Michigan's appearances in the Big Ten Championship and the College Football Playoff semifinal Fiesta Bowl.

Over the 2022 season, Corum had 1,463 rushing yards, 18 rushing touchdowns, and one receiving touchdown.

Corum finished seventh in voting for the Heisman Trophy, won the Chicago Tribune Silver Football as best player in the Big Ten, and was named a unanimous All-American.

2023 season
On January 9, 2023, Corum announced that he would be staying at Michigan for another year.

Statistics

References

External links

 Michigan Wolverines bio

2000 births
Living people
American football running backs
Michigan Wolverines football players
All-American college football players
People from Marshall, Virginia
Players of American football from Baltimore
Players of American football from Virginia